Colonel Guy Johnson and Karonghyontye (Captain David Hill) is a 1776 portrait by Benjamin West, an Anglo-American painter of historical scenes around and after the time of the American War of Independence. Benjamin West was among the founders of the Royal Academy in London, serving its president from 1792 to 1805 and 1806 to 1820.

The portrait depicts the military officer and diplomat Guy Johnson and the Mohawk chief Karonghyontye (who also went by the English name of David Hill). Johnson was the British superintendent of northeastern America's six Indian nations and commissioned the portrait in 1776 while in London to secure that royal appointment. Sailing from Canada, Johnson must have been accompanied by his close friend Karonghyontye. The alliance between British forces and several Indian tribes seriously threatened the rebel colonists' chances of victory during the Revolutionary War.

In the portrait Benjamin West signifies Johnson's role as ambassador to the Indians by equipping him in a red-coated uniform with moccasins, wampum belt, Indian blanket, and Mohawk cap. Karonghyontye is shown pointing to a peace pipe, while Johnson grasps a musket. This could suggest that harmony between Europeans and Indians will be maintained at all costs. The concept of cooperation extends to the background, where an Indian family gathers peacefully before a British military tent.

References

1776 in art
Collections of the National Gallery of Art
Paintings by Benjamin West